Peristernia scabra is a species of sea snail, a marine gastropod mollusk in the family Fasciolariidae, the spindle snails, the tulip snails and their allies.

This is a taxon inquirendum.

Description
The length of the shell attains 14.2 mm

Distribution
This marine species occurs off New Caledonia.

References

 Souverbie, M. & Montrouzier, X., 1871. - Descriptions d'espèces nouvelles de l'Archipel Calédonien. Journal de Conchyliologie 18("1870"): 422-433

External links
 Souverbie S.M. (1869). Diagnoses de mollusques inédits provenant de la Nouvelle Calédonie. Journal de Conchyliologie. 17(4): 416-421
 Tryon, G. W. (1880-1881). Manual of conchology, structural and systematic, with illustrations of the species, ser. 1., vol. 3: Tritonidae, Fusidae, Buccinidae. pp 1-310, pls 1-87. Philadelphia, published by the author

Fasciolariidae
Gastropods described in 1869